The Singapore national field hockey team represents Singapore in men's international field hockey competitions.

History
Singapore has competed only once in the Olympics, in field hockey at the 1956 Summer Olympics in Melbourne, Australia. Placed in a group with India, Afghanistan, and United States, Singapore won 6-1 against USA, 5-0 against Afghanistan, before losing 6-0 to eventual gold medalists India in their final game. They were runners-up in their first group, but in the classification round did not win any games, losing by big margins to Belgium, Australia, and New Zealand to finish eighth overall out of twelve teams. 

Singapore has also competed in the Asian Games (with little success) and in the Southeast Asian Games (several silver medals, generally only beaten by Malaysia).

Tournament record

Summer Olympics
1956 – 8th place

Asian Games
1962 – 5th place
1970 – 5th place
1998 – 7th place
2010 – 10th place
2014 – 9th place

Asia Cup
1982 – 6th place
1985 – 9th place
2007 – 10th place

AHF Cup
1997 – 4th place
2002 – 4th place
2008 – 
2012 – 6th place
2016 – 4th place
 2022 – 9th place

Hockey World League
2012–13 – Round 1
2014–15 – 32nd place
2016–17 – Round 1

FIH Hockey Series
2018–19 – Second round

See also
Singapore women's national field hockey team

References

External links
SingaporeHockey.org
Singapore National Mens Team

Asian men's national field hockey teams
Field hockey
National team